A Dutch Courtyard (1658–1660) is an oil-on-canvas painting by the Dutch painter Pieter de Hooch. It is part of the collection of the Mauritshuis Museum in The Hague.,

This painting by de Hooch (sometimes referred to as de Hoogh) was documented by Hofstede de Groot in 1910, who wrote:
295. A Courtyard with Two Cavaliers and a Woman Drinking. Sm. Suppl. 30. A view in a courtyard, at the end of which an open door with two steps leads into the garden at the back, the trees in which rise above the low wall. In the left foreground a man who is smoking a pipe sits in profile to the right; he wears a black coat, a grey cloak, and a black hat. To the right, opposite him at the table, stands a woman drinking a glass of beer; she wears a yellowish-grey jacket, a red skirt, and a blue apron. Behind the table and between the man and woman sits another man, wearing a cuirass and a hat, who faces the spectator; he holds a mug in his hand and looks up with a smile at the woman. From the right a little girl holding a pot comes across the courtyard. In the left background is seen the tower of the Nieuwe Kerk at Delft. The picture agrees exactly with that in the collection of Lady Wantage (297), except that in the Wantage picture the figure of the man behind the table is absent. 
The figures are unusually small in relation to the space, but the effect of sunlight is delicately rendered. Canvas, 30 1/2 inches by 25 1/2 inches. An old copy was in a Dutch dealer's possession in 1903. Described by Waagen (ii. 130).

Sales: 
 C. S. Roos, Amsterdam, August 28, 1820, No. 51 (600 or 750 florins, Van Eyk). 
 (Possibly) S. A. Koopman, Utrecht, April 9, 1847, if Sm. is wrong in saying that it belonged to Baron de Rothschild in 1842. (Compare 299.) 
 In the possession of Baron L. de Rothschild, 1842 (Sm.). 
 In the collection of Lionel de Rothschild, London.

Now [in 1910], probably, in the collection of Mr. Alfred de Rothschild.

According to the National Gallery of Art, the provenance of the painting after it was in the collection of Alfred de Rothschild was that it was bequeathed to his illegitimate daughter, Almina Victoria, Countess of Carnarvon. Then it was sold in 1924 to  the Duveen Brothers, Inc. Then it was sold in November 1924 to Andrew W. Mellon of Pittsburgh and Washington, D.C., who deeded it 28 December 1934 to The A.W. Mellon Educational and Charitable Trust in Pittsburgh. From there it was gifted in 1937 to the National Gallery of Art.

References

1650s paintings
Collections of the National Gallery of Art
Paintings by Pieter de Hooch